UAI may refer to:

 Union Académique Internationale, French for International Union of Academies
 Universities Admission Index
 Union astronomique internationale, the French name for the International Astronomical Union
 Unione Astrofili Italiani
 Universal Armament Interface
 Universidad Adolfo Ibáñez, Spanish for Adolfo Ibáñez University
 Universidad Abierta Interamericana, Spanish for Interamerican Open University
 Unprotected Anal Intercourse
 Uruguayan Antarctic Institute
 Use Available Inventory
 The annual conferences on Uncertainty in Artificial Intelligence, organized by the Association for Uncertainty in Artificial Intelligence (AUAI)
 Uncertainty avoidance index, the amount of tolerance of unpredictability